The 1938–39 season was the forty-fourth season in which Dundee competed at a Scottish national level, and the first season playing in the second tier, having been relegated from the Scottish Division One the previous season. In their first season in Division Two, Dundee would finish in 6th place. Dundee would also compete in the Scottish Cup, where they were knocked out in the 2nd round by Clyde in a replay.

Scottish Division Two 

Statistics provided by Dee Archive.

League table

Scottish Cup 

Statistics provided by Dee Archive.

Player Statistics 
Statistics provided by Dee Archive

|}

See also 

 List of Dundee F.C. seasons

References

External links 

 1938-39 Dundee season on Fitbastats

Dundee F.C. seasons
Dundee